Russia competed at the 2012 Winter Youth Olympics in Innsbruck, Austria.

Medalists

|width="30%" align=left valign=top|

Alpine skiing

Russia qualified 2 athletes.

Boys

Girls

Biathlon

Russia qualified 4 athletes.

Boys

Girls

Mixed

Bobsleigh

Russia qualified 2 athletes.

Boys

Cross-country skiing

Russia qualified 4 athletes.

Boys

Girls

Sprint

Curling

Russia qualified a team.

Roster
Skip: Mikhail Vaskov
Third: Anastasia Moskaleva
Second: Alexandr Korshunov
Lead: Marina Verenich

Mixed team 

Round robin

Draw 1

Draw 2

Draw 3

Draw 4

Draw 5

Draw 6

Draw 7

Mixed doubles

Round of 32

Round of 16

Quarterfinals

Semifinals

Bronze Medal Game

Figure skating 

Russia qualified 11 athletes.

Boys

Girls

Pairs

Mixed

Freestyle skiing 

Russia qualified 2 athletes.

Ski Cross

Ice hockey 

Russia qualified a boys' team.

Roster

 Stanislav Kondratyev
 Sergey Korobov
 Maxim Lazarev
 Alexander Mikulovich
 Eduard Nasybullin
 Arkhip Nekolenko
 Ivan Nikolishin
 Egor Orlov
 Rostislav Osipov
 Alexander Protapovich
 Dmitry Sergeev
 Evgeny Svechnikov
 Andrey Svetlakov
 Maxim Tretyak
 Egor Tsvetkov
 Daniil Vovchenko
 Ilia Zinovev

Preliminary round

Semifinal

Gold medal game

Luge 

Russia qualified 6 athletes.

Boys

Girls

Team

Mixed sports
Mixed

Nordic combined 

Russia qualified 1 athlete.

Boys

Short track 

Russia qualified 2 athletes.

Boys

Girls

Mixed

Skeleton 

Russia qualified 3 athletes.

Boys

Girls

Ski jumping 

Russia qualified 2 athletes.

Boys

Girls

Team w/Nordic Combined

Snowboarding 

Russia qualified 3 athletes.

Boys

Girls

Speed skating 

Russia qualified 4 athletes.

Boys

Girls

See also 
 Russia at the 2012 Summer Olympics

References 

2012 in Russian sport
Nations at the 2012 Winter Youth Olympics
Russia at the Youth Olympics